Jenson is an English language patronymic surname meaning "son of Jens".  The prefix "Jens-" is a German and Danish surname. Jenson is rarely used as a given name.  There are alternate spellings, including the Danish variant, Jensen.

People with the name Jenson include:

Given name
 Jenson Brooksby (b. 2000), American professional tennis player
 Jenson Button (b. 1980), British racing driver
 Jenson Joseph (b. 1966), Antiguan cricketer
 Jenson Seelt (b. 2003), Dutch footballer
 Jenson LaBrecque (b.2000), Legendary American ice hockey player
 Jenson Jarvis (b.1993),
Actor / Musician

Surname

Andrew Jenson (1850–1941), church historian for the Latter Day Saints 
Bob Jenson (1931–2018), American politician and educator
Dan Jenson (born 1975), Australian professional squash player 
Mary Goodrich Jenson (1907–2004), American aviator and journalist
Nicolas Jenson (1420–1480), French engraver, pioneer printer and typographer
Robert Jenson (1930–2017), American Lutheran and ecumenical theologian
Roy Jenson (1927–2007), Canadian actor and footballer; father of Sasha Jenson
Sasha Jenson (born 1964), American film and television actor; son of Roy Jenson
Vicky Jenson (born c. 1957), American animator

See also 
 Jansen (surname)
 Jens (given name)
 Jensen (surname)
 Jensen Ackles
 Jenson (disambiguation)
 Jenssen

Germanic-language surnames
Masculine given names
Surnames of Frisian origin
Patronymic surnames